The albums discography of South Korean girl group Twice consists of seven studio albums, twelve EPs, one reissue studio album, three reissue EPs, four compilation albums and one compilation EP. The group was formed by JYP Entertainment in July 2015 through the survival television show Sixteen.

In South Korea, Twice debuted in October 2015 with the release of their debut EP, The Story Begins. In 2016, the group's second and third EP, Page Two and Twicecoaster: Lane 1 were released. The latter became one of the best-selling albums by a girl group in the history of Gaon Album Chart, with over 475,000 copies sold. Its reissue, Twicecoaster: Lane 2, was released in February 2017 and the group's fourth EP, Signal, was later released in May. In October, their debut studio album, Twicetagram, and its lead single debuted at number-one on the Billboard World Albums chart and World Digital Song Sales chart, respectively, becoming the first female Korean act to top both charts simultaneously. The album was subsequently reissued as Merry & Happy in December. The former three releases became the top three best-selling albums by a girl group in 2017.

In 2018, the group released their fifth EP, What Is Love?, in April, and was reissued as Summer Nights in July. Yes or Yes, their sixth EP, followed in November, with a reissue titled as The Year of "Yes" in December. The group maintained their best-selling girl group of the year status. Selling over 250,000 copies, What Is Love?, Summer Nights, Yes or Yes and The Year of "Yes" each earned a platinum certification from the Korea Music Content Association (KMCA). In 2019, the group's seventh and eighth EP, Fancy You and Feel Special, were released in April and September, respectively and both later received a double platinum certification from KMCA. In 2020, the group's ninth EP, More & More and second Korean studio album, Eyes Wide Open both charted on the Billboard 200. 

In 2021, Twice's tenth EP, Taste of Love, peaked at number one on the Billboard Top Album Sales chart, making it the first EP from a girl group to do so. It was also the first EP from a girl group to enter the top 10 of the Billboard 200. Later in the same year, their third Korean studio album, Formula of Love: O+T=<3, earned them their first triple platinum certification from KMCA. In 2022, after the group's contract renewal with JYP Entertainment, their eleventh EP, Between 1&2 became their first EP to sell over a million copies. In 2023, the group's twelfth EP, Ready to Be, was released becoming their best-selling EP in South Korea.

In Japan, Twice debuted in June 2017 with their first compilation album, #Twice, earning their first platinum certification from the Recording Industry Association of Japan (RIAJ). The group's first Japanese studio album, BDZ, was released in 2018 and was later platinum-certified. The repackaged edition of the album was released in December 2018. In 2019, their second compilation album, #Twice2, was released in March and is platinum-certified by the RIAJ. In November of the same year, they released their second Japanese album, &Twice. In 2020, a repackage of &Twice and their third compilation album, #Twice3, were released. In 2021, their third Japanese studio album, Perfect World, was released. In 2022, the compilation album #Twice4 and the studio album Celebrate were released.

As of 2023, Twice have earned eleven number-one albums in South Korea, nine number-one albums on Japan's Oricon Albums Chart, six number-one albums on the Billboard Japan Hot Albums and four number-one albums on Billboard's World Albums. The group is the highest-selling girl group in South Korea, with over 7.2 million albums sold as of 2021. They have sold over 14 million albums in South Korea and Japan, cumulatively, as of 2022.

Studio albums 
Korean studio albums are marketed by JYP Entertainment as a "Full Album".

Reissue studio albums

Extended plays
Marketed by JYP Entertainment as a "Mini Album".

Reissue extended plays 
Marketed by JYP Entertainment as a "Special Album".

Compilations

Compilation albums

Compilation extended plays

Notes

References 

 
Discographies of South Korean artists
K-pop music group discographies